Okay is a 2002 Danish drama film directed by Jesper W. Nielsen.

Plot 
Nete is a strong woman of 35 who manages effectively her job, husband, and teenage daughter. After her widowed father suddenly becomes ill, Nete discovers he may have only three weeks to live. Despite their poor relationship, Nete insists he leaves his flat and moves in with her, saying "You should die with your family." She even tries to reconcile him with his estranged gay son, her brother. When he does not die, his presence increasingly places a strain on Nete's family. His appetite returns and the doctors reconsider the prognosis. With pressures increasing in a limited space, Nete's husband accepts offered comfort elsewhere, her daughter rebels with her grandfather's encouragement, and the relationship between Nete and her father unravels.

Cast 
 Paprika Steen – Nete
 Troels Lyby – Kristian
 Ole Ernst – Netes Father
 Nicolaj Kopernikus – Martin
  – Katrine
 Laura Drasbæk – Tanja
 Trine Dyrholm – Trisse
  – Janni
 Jesper Christensen – Læge
 Henrik Prip – Nete's boss

References

External links 
 
 
 

2002 drama films
2002 films
Danish drama films
2000s Danish-language films
Films directed by Jesper W. Nielsen